Hawarden Municipal Airport  was a city-owned, public-use airport located two nautical miles (4 km) north of the central business district of Hawarden, a city in Sioux County, Iowa. It was closed at unspecified date.

Facilities and aircraft 
Hawarden Municipal Airport covered an area of 69 acres (28 ha) at an elevation of 1,190 feet (363 m) above mean sea level. It had one runway designated 16/34 with a concrete surface measuring 2,030 by 50 feet (619 x 15 m).

For the 12-month period ending April 16, 2008, the airport had 1,250 general aviation aircraft operations, an average of 104 per month. At that time there were five single-engine aircraft based at this airport.

See also 
 List of airports in Iowa

References

External links 
 Hawarden Municipal (2Y2) at Iowa DOT airport directory
 Aerial image as of April 1996 from USGS The National Map
 

Defunct airports in the United States
Airports in Iowa
Transportation buildings and structures in Sioux County, Iowa